Georgi Dimitrov (1882–1949) was a Bulgarian communist and prime minister of the country from 1946 to 1949.

Georgi Dimitrov may also refer to:
 G. M. Dimitrov (1903–1972), Bulgarian politician
 Georgi Dimitrov Dimitrov (born 1958), Bulgarian sociologist
 Georgi Dimitrov (alpine skier) (born 1930), Bulgarian Olympic skier
 Georgi Dimitrov (footballer, born 1931) (1931–1978), Bulgarian football player
 Georgi Dimitrov (footballer, born 1959) (1959–2021), Bulgarian football player
 Georgi Dimitrov (composer) (1904–1979), Bulgarian composer
 Georgi Dimitrov (conductor), Bulgarian conductor with the Rousse Philharmonic Orchestra
 Georgi Dimitrov (gymnast) (born 1911), Bulgarian Olympic gymnast